Donald Francis McGinley (June 30, 1920 – July 6, 2005) was a Democratic politician from Nebraska who served a single term in the United States House of Representatives from 1959 to 1961 and as Nebraska's 32nd lieutenant governor from 1983 to 1987 under Governor Bob Kerrey.

McGinley was a highly educated attorney with degrees from the University of Notre Dame and Georgetown University.  Before practicing law, he served in the United States Army Air Forces during World War II and was a reporter for the Denver Register.

He was admitted to the bar and began his practice in Ogallala in 1950. After returning to Nebraska, McGinley was elected to the state legislature in 1954 and to Congress four years later. He served a single term before losing to Republican David Martin.

He was a delegate to the 1964 Democratic National Convention and the 1968 Democratic National Convention. He became a judge in the Court of Industrial Relations in Lincoln, Nebraska from 1976 to 1980.

More than two decades later, McGinley made a political comeback as the running mate of Nebraska Gov. Bob Kerrey.  He served as the state's lieutenant governor for four years and was later appointed by Gov. Ben Nelson to chair the Nebraska Selective Service Commission.  He died in Lincoln on July 6, 2005. He was a member of the American Legion, Veterans of Foreign Wars, the Elks, the Knights of Columbus.

References
 
 

1920 births
2005 deaths
People from Ogallala, Nebraska
Georgetown University alumni
Democratic Party Nebraska state senators
University of Notre Dame alumni
Nebraska lawyers
Nebraska state court judges
United States Army Air Forces soldiers
United States Army personnel of World War II
Lieutenant Governors of Nebraska
Democratic Party members of the United States House of Representatives from Nebraska
20th-century American politicians
20th-century American judges
People from Keith County, Nebraska
20th-century American lawyers